Carlisle Cricket Club may refer to:
Carlisle Cricket Club Ground in Dublin, Ireland
Carlisle Cricket Club (England), club which plays at Edenside ground in Carlisle

See also
Petriana#Excavations, Roman bathhouse found at Carlisle Cricket Club (Edenside) ground in England